Commonwealth is the seventh novel by American author Ann Patchett, published in 2016. The novel begins with an illicit kiss that leads to an affair that destroys two marriages and creates a reluctantly blended family. In a series of vignettes spanning fifty years, it tells the story of the six children whose lives were disrupted and how they intertwined.

Plot
It started at Franny Keating’s christening party. Bert Cousins wasn't even invited, but looking for an excuse to get out of the house, away from his three noisy children and pregnant wife for a few hours one weekend, he followed up on another fellow’s invitation. He brought a bottle of gin and he took a kiss from Franny’s very beautiful mother that day. Thus began an affair that ended two marriages and led Bert to begin thinking up excuses to get out of the house away from his four children from southern California and his two stepchildren every day of their summer vacations in Virginia.

Bringing the children of two divorces together under one roof may be called a “blended family” but this family does not blend. There forms a curious commonwealth of neglected children. This is the story about how their lives were disrupted and how they intertwined and what really happened the day that one child died. Twenty six years after her christening, when law school dropout Franny embarks on an affair with a much older very famous novelist, she has no inkling that her childhood memories could, in time, be woven into a best-selling novel, titled “Commonwealth.” When the baby of the family, Albie Cousins, discovers his past in black and white, readers are struck by the theft of family secrets, raising questions about borders between fact and fiction. Over the course of five decades, while the Keating-Cousins children were all going their own ways, they were still a family, still bound by shared memories and ultimately real affection.

Development history
In an interview entitled "Ann Patchett Calls 'Commonwealth' Her 'Autobiographical First Novel'," Patchett said, “My parents got divorced when I was young, and my mother married someone who had four children. And we moved to the other side of the country, albeit not to Virginia. And I think that that being thrown together, being pulled out of a family and put into a family has always been very interesting to me. ... It's so complicated. It's so complicated to figure out who you're going to spend Christmas with.” Noting that many authors’ first novels are based on their own experience, Patchett explained that she had started her career wanting “to prove that I had this great imagination. But the wonderful thing about publishing this book at 52 is that I know that I am capable of working from a place of deep imagination. Now I just feel like I own every part of myself and my life and my imagination and the rocky terrain of my own brain, and that feels really good.”

Major themes

Fact in fiction 
Patchett frankly used her own memories in writing this novel and in it she raises the question of whether writing fiction based on real events and people is inherently exploitative. The famous novelist in the book, Leon Posen, uses Franny’s childhood memories.“He said that what she had told him was nothing but the jumping-off point for his imagination ... It wasn't her family. No one would see them there.” But, of course, Franny’s sibling and her step-siblings do see themselves there. This famous stranger’s book is a jarring act of exposure and misrepresentation of their most private moments.” Prior to this book, Patchett set all her novels far from home-- for example, the idea for the plot of Bel Canto came from an actual hostage crisis in Peru that she had read about in the news. Even so, in an interview about Commonwealth, Patchett said, “I’ve always been writing about my family, but up until now I'd been very clever to hide everyone in giant costumes made out of chicken wire and masking tape.” She had consulted her family before publishing Commonwealth, but about her own feelings said, “I have a real fear that the whole publication of this novel is going to center around questions of autobiography, .... Most of the things in this book didn't actually happen, but the feelings are very close to home. Or, as my mother [the novelist Jeanne Ray] said, “None of it happened and all of it's true.”

Time 
Events in Commonwealth begin in the 1960s and take place over 50 years, time enough for children to be transformed in maturity, to recover from heartbreaks, to forgive one another and possibly even their parents. Interviewed in Slate Ann Patchett is quoted saying, “One of the things I'm obsessed with in all my books is time, and I felt that time in my work was contracting. ... and so I was very interested in writing a book that covered more time. ... I wanted to be able to move through time and between characters...” According to Ron Charles of the Washington Post “In someone else’s hands, “Commonwealth” would be a saga, a sprawling chronicle of events and relationships spread out over dozens of chapters. But Patchett is daringly elliptical here. Not only are decades missing, but they're also out of order. We’re not so much told this story as allowed to listen in from another room as a door swings open and closed.” Jeanne Brown, in the Los Angeles Times called it “the 50-year Fallout After an Illicit kiss” She pointed out that forty years after Calvin died, family members are still not sure what happened. “The present story lines are overshadowed by the events of the past, the book’s most contemporary scenes existing primarily as an entrée to older memories.”

Reception 
Reviewers praised Patchett’s skill in thoroughly engaging readers without using the fast-paced plots or exotic locations of her earlier novels. The novel was described as “exquisite,” “masterful,” “breathtaking, perceptive, and poignant,” “tenderhearted and tough, dryly funny and at times intensely moving,” “unpretentious and ultimately heartbreaking, miniaturist but also sprawling” and "full of wit and warmth", as well as "a funny, sad, and ultimately heart-wrenching family portrait," and a wry but compassionate tale of step-siblings forced to become family.

Jennifer Senior observed in the New York Times, “Ms. Patchett has long explored the awkwardness, pain and grace that come when total strangers are forced into unexpected alliances. This theme found its fullest expression in her 2001 best seller, Bel Canto, whose glamorous characters were taken hostage at a birthday party. But a far more common form of involuntary companionship — which doesn't involve guns but often feels like it does — is the blended family. Tolerating your own kin is hard enough. Tolerating someone else’s is harder by a coefficient of 10.” As Ron Charles explained in the Washington Post, early in the novel “... we’re thoroughly invested in these families, wrapped up in their lives by Patchett’s storytelling, which has never seemed more effortlessly graceful. This is minimalism that magically speaks volumes,” Janelle Brown of the Los Angeles Times said, “Reading “Commonwealth” is a transporting experience, as if you've stepped inside Patchett’s own juice-saturated memories and are seeing scenes flash by, in all their visceral emotion. It feels like Patchett’s most intimate novel, and is without a doubt one of her best.”

The novel was a finalist for the 2016 National Book Critics Circle Award for Fiction.

References

External links 
 https://www.harpercollins.com/9780062491794/commonwealth

2016 American novels
Novels by Ann Patchett
HarperCollins books